CJ Lim (born Chwen Jeng Lim, 1964 in Malaysia) is the Academic Professor of Architecture and Urbanism at The Bartlett Faculty of the Built Environment at University College London (UCL); and served as Vice-Dean and Pro-Provost of University College London. He is the founder and director of Studio 8 Architects, a UK-based multidisciplinary and international practice in sustainable urban planning, architecture and landscape, focusing on interpretations of social, cultural and environmental programmes. Along with Simon Dickens and Bernd Felsinger (2006-2016), Lim leads PG Unit 10 within The Bartlett School of Architecture's  Architecture MArch (ARB/RIBA Part 2) course.

Lim's research of cities is developed through a new urban paradigm – the 'Smartcity'. The work addresses what the spatial and phenomenological implications are when sustainable design is applied to a city and the role that citizens play in the production of a relevant social space. A central component of the Smartcity is the establishment of an ecological symbiosis between nature and built form to create diverse forms of resilient landscapes and urbanism including and beyond urban agriculture.

Lim has held a long preoccupation with architectural storytelling, exploring how narratives from science fiction, history, politics and humanity can inform spatial propositions and the innovation of architecture and resilient cities through his research and publications including ‘Once Upon A China’ (2021), ‘Short Stories: London in two-and-a-half dimensions’ (2011), ‘Virtually Venice’ (2006), and ‘Sins + Other Spatial Relatives’ (2000).

The Royal Institute of British Architects has awarded Lim the President's Medals International Teaching Awards for contribution to architectural education on four occasions (1999, 1998, 1998, 1997). In 2006, the Royal Academy of Arts London awarded him the Grand 'AJ/Bovis Lend Lease' Architecture Prize. He also won the Worshipful Company of Chartered Architects Award in 2006 and 2007.

He received his education at the Architectural Association School of Architecture (AA) in London.

Selected bibliography
Once Upon A China (Routledge, 2021) CJ Lim and Steve McCloy
Smartcities, Resilient Landscapes and Eco-warriors (Routledge, 2019) CJ Lim and Ed Liu
Inhabitable Infrastructures: Science fiction or urban future? (Routledge, 2017) CJ Lim
 Food City (Routledge, 2014) CJ Lim
 Short Stories: London in two-and-a-half dimensions (Routledge, 2011) CJ Lim and Ed Liu
 Smartcities + Eco-warriors (Routledge, 2010) CJ Lim and Ed Liu
 Virtually Venice (The British Council, 2006) CJ Lim
 Neo Architecture: CJ Lim (Images Publishing Australia, 2005)
 Devices (Architectural Press Elsevier, 2005; Routledge, 2013) CJ Lim (ed.)
 Museums [work in process] (Glasgow School of Art Press, 2004) CJ Lim
 How Green is your Garden? (Wiley Academy UK + USA, 2003) CJ Lim and Ed Liu
 Realms of Impossibility: Air (Wiley Academy, 2002) CJ Lim and Ed Liu (eds.)
 Realms of Impossibility: Water (Wiley Academy, 2002) CJ Lim and Ed Liu (eds.)
 Realms of Impossibility: Ground (Wiley Academy, 2002) CJ Lim and Ed Liu (eds.)
 Sins + Other Spatial Relatives (Ind-E 8 Publishing London, 2000) CJ Lim
 441/10...We'll Reconfigure The Space When You're Ready (Ind-E 8 Publishing London, 1996) CJ Lim

References

External links
 The Bartlett Faculty of the Built Environment, UCL
 The Bartlett School of Architecture
 Debrett’s: Prof CJ Lim
 CJ Lim/Studio 8 Architects

1964 births
Living people
Academics of University College London
Alumni of the Architectural Association School of Architecture